Jarzębowo  (formerly ) is a village in the administrative district of Gmina Wolin, within Kamień County, West Pomeranian Voivodeship, in north-western Poland.

The village has a population of 70.

References

Villages in Kamień County